Torgny is a given name. Notable people with the name include:

Torgny Anderberg (1919–2000), Swedish actor and film director
Torgny Lindgren (1938–2017), Swedish writer
Torgny Mogren (born 1963), former Swedish cross country skier
Torgny Säve-Söderbergh (born 1914), Swedish writer, translator, and professor of Egyptology at Uppsala University
Torgny Segerstedt (1876–1945), Swedish professor and scholar of comparative religion
Torgny T:son Segerstedt (1908–1999), Swedish philosopher and sociologist
Torgny Söderberg, Swedish songwriter
Torgny Segerstedt (1876–1945), Swedish scholar of comparative religion, editor-in-chief of Göteborgs Handels- och Sjöfartstidning (1917–1945)
Torgny Torgnysson Segerstedt (1908–1999), Swedish philosopher and sociologist
Torgny Wåhlander, Swedish long jumper
Torgny Wickman (1911–1997), Swedish screenwriter and film director

See also 
Torgny (village), a village in the Belgian municipality of Rouvroy, Wallonia
Torgny Melins, dansband from Säffle, Sweden
Torgny the Lawspeaker, the name of one of at least three generations of lawspeakers by the name Þorgnýr
Torgny Peak, bare rock peak 2 nautical miles (3.7 km) west of Fenriskjeften Mountain in the Drygalski Mountains of Queen Maud Land

Swedish masculine given names